Francis Knollys, 1st Viscount Knollys,  (16 July 1837 – 15 August 1924) was a British courtier. He served as Private Secretary to the Sovereign from 1901 to 1913.

Background and education

Knollys was the son of Sir William Thomas Knollys (1797–1883), of Blount's Court at Rotherfield Peppard in Oxfordshire, and was educated in Guernsey. He entered the Royal Military College, Sandhurst, in 1851, and was commissioned into the 23rd Foot as an ensign in 1854.

Career
In the following year, however, Knollys joined the Department of the Commissioners of Audit as a junior examiner. In 1862, he became Secretary to the Treasurer to the Prince of Wales. In 1870, he was appointed Private Secretary to the Prince of Wales, an office he held until the Prince, Edward, became King in 1901. He was also Groom-in-Waiting to the Prince of Wales 1886–1901. Knollys then became Private Secretary to the Sovereign, an office he filled until 1913 (jointly with Arthur Bigge, 1st Baron Stamfordham from 1910). He was known for his loyalty and discretion in this role. He was also Gentleman Usher to Queen Victoria 1868–1901, and a Lord-in-waiting to Queen Mary 1910–1924.

Personal life
Lord Knollys died in August 1924, aged 87. His titles were inherited by his son, Edward George William Tyrwhitt Knollys, 2nd Viscount Knollys (1895–1966).

In Popular Culture

After his appointment as Private Secretary to the Sovereign, Lord Knollys was well known as the public face of the Court, and is often mentioned in memoirs and fiction of the period. In his 1911 novel "C.Q., or in the Wireless House", Arthur Train wrote of his fixing a scandal (fictitious, this time):

"She was still spoken of as one of the most beautiful women in the world; but the exquisite hour of her perfection had passed. Then, perhaps feeling that her supremacy was no longer undisputed, a sense of pique at younger and fresher women had led her into certain too flagrant indiscretions that could not be overlooked.

Lord Knollys had intimated that a knighthood might please her husband; and the directorate of the Royal Bank of Edinburgh, of which he was the London manager, by a coincidence no less extraordinary than it was timely, had proposed that he should open a similar branch in New York and temporarily become its resident agent. In other words, royalty had politely indicated that, although it was deeply pained to do so, it must, for policy's sake, at least, withdraw that intimacy which it had previously been pleased to extend".

Honours
Knollys was created a Companion of the Order of the Bath (CB) in 1876, and promoted to Knight Commander (KCB) in 1897 and to Knight Grand Cross (GCB) in 1908. He was also made a Knight Grand Cross of the Royal Victorian Order (GCVO) in 1901, a Knight Commander of the Order of St Michael and St George (KCMG) in 1886, and awarded the Imperial Service Order (ISO) in 1903. In the 1902 Coronation Honours list, it was announced he would receive a barony, and he was raised to the peerage as Baron Knollys, of Caversham in the County of Oxford, on 15 July 1902. He took the oath and his seat in the House of Lords the following month, on 7 August. He became a Privy Councillor in 1910, and in 1911 he was further honoured when he was made Viscount Knollys, of Caversham in the County of Oxford.

 GCB: Knight Grand Cross of the Order of the Bath - 1908 (Knight Commander - KCB 1897; Companion - CB, 1876)
 GCVO: Knight Grand Cross of the Royal Victorian Order - 2 February 1901
 KCMG : Knight Commander of the Most Distinguished Order of St Michael and St George - 1886
 ISO: Imperial Service Order - 1903
 He also received the Queen Victoria Version of the Royal Household Long and Faithful Service Medal with a bar for 10 additional years of service to the Royal Family (35 Total Years).

References

Cited source

External links

1837 births
1924 deaths
Royal Welch Fusiliers officers
Companions of the Imperial Service Order
Knights Grand Cross of the Order of the Bath
Knights Grand Cross of the Royal Victorian Order
Knights Commander of the Order of St Michael and St George
Members of the Privy Council of the United Kingdom
Graduates of the Royal Military College, Sandhurst
Viscounts in the Peerage of the United Kingdom
Permanent Lords-in-Waiting
Private Secretaries to the Sovereign
People from Oxfordshire
Directors of the Great Eastern Railway
Francis
Civil servants in the Audit Office (United Kingdom)
Peers created by Edward VII
Viscounts created by George V